Linda Hoy is a British author who is best known for her works for children and young adults.

Her first novel, Your Friend, Rebecca, was published in 1981. It is now a set text in many British comprehensive schools, and often used to help young people deal with bereavement.

Another novel, Haddock 'n' Chips, was winner of the 1994 Children's Book Award. A novel based on the fortunes of Sheffield United football team, United on Vacation, was shortlisted for the same award in 1995. Her first television play, Emily, was winner of the Silver Award for Drama in New York in 1985. She received a Writers' Award for New Writing from the Arts Council in 1999.

She was a Fellow at York St John University between 2004 and 2007, and a Fellow at the University of Sheffield between 2007 and 2010. She has taught creative writing at Sheffield Hallam University and regularly leads writing workshops in schools and universities. Her daughter is the US-based academic and writer Mikita Brottman.

A new non-fiction work, The Effect was published on Sept 28, 2012. Exploring the connections between time, spirituality and quantum physics, it claims to "offer the strongest evidence yet for the existence of a soul and an afterlife".

She lives in Sheffield, UK, and is represented by the Robert Dudley literary agency.

Books
Your Friend, Rebecca,	        The Bodley Head, 1981
The Damned,	                The Bodley Head, 1983
Emmeline Pankhurst (Biography),	Hamish Hamilton, 1985
The Alternative Assembly-Book,	Longmans, 1985
Poems for Peace (Ed.),	        Pluto, 1986
Nightmare Park,	              HarperCollins (Armada), 1987
Kiss,         	                Walker Paperbacks, 1989
Ring of Death,        	        HarperCollins (Armada), 1990
Haddock 'n' Chips,	                Walker,	1993
United on Vacation,	        Walker,	1994
The Pit,	                      Ginn & Co,  1995
Nightmare Express,	                HarperCollins,	1996
The Oracle,            	        Ginn & Co, 1997
Dear Poltergeist,        	        Walker Paperbacks, 2000
The Effect,                        O Books, 2012

References

Sources
Royal Literary Fund - Linda Hoy
The Effect at O-Books
The Effect website

British children's writers
Living people
People associated with York St John University
Academics of the University of Sheffield
Academics of Sheffield Hallam University
Writers from Sheffield
Year of birth missing (living people)